The Kingdom of Travancore (/ˈtrævənkɔːr/), also known as the Kingdom of Thiruvithamkoor, was an Indian kingdom from c. 1729 until 1949. It was ruled by the Travancore Royal Family from Padmanabhapuram, and later Thiruvananthapuram. At its zenith, the kingdom covered most of the south of modern-day Kerala (Idukki, Kottayam, Alappuzha, Pathanamthitta, Kollam, and Thiruvananthapuram districts, and some portions of Ernakulam district), and the southernmost part of modern-day Tamil Nadu (Kanyakumari district and some parts of Tenkasi district) with the Thachudaya Kaimal's enclave of Irinjalakuda Koodalmanikyam temple in the neighbouring Kingdom of Cochin. However Tangasseri area of Kollam city and Anchuthengu near Attingal in Thiruvananthapuram district, were British colonies and were part of the Malabar District until 30 June 1927, and Tirunelveli district from 1 July 1927 onwards. Travancore merged with the erstwhile princely state of Cochin to form Travancore-Cochin in 1950. The five Tamil-majority Taluks of Vilavancode, Kalkulam, Thovalai, Agastheeswaram, and Sengottai were transferred from Travancore-Cochin to Madras State in 1956. The Malayalam-speaking regions of Travancore-Cochin merged with the Malabar District (excluding the Laccadive and Minicoy Islands) and the Kasaragod taluk of the South Canara district in Madras State to form the modern Malayalam-state of Kerala on 1 November 1956, according to the States Reorganisation Act, 1956 passed by the Government of India.

The official flag of the state was red with a dextrally-coiled silver conch shell (Turbinella pyrum) at its centre. The coat of arms had two elephants standing to the left and right with the conch shell (Turibinella pyrum) in the centre. The ribbon is white with black Devanagari script. Travancore was bounded by the princely state of the Kingdom of Cochin and the Coimbatore district of Madras Presidency to the north, Madurai and Tirunelveli districts of Pandya Nadu region in Madras Presidency to the east, the Indian Ocean to the south, and the Arabian Sea to the west. As of the 1911 Census of India, Travancore was divided into five: Padmanabhapuram, Trivandrum, Quilon, Kottayam, and Devikulam, of which the first and last were predominantly Tamil-speaking areas.

King Marthanda Varma inherited the small feudal state of Venad in 1723, and built it into Travancore, one of the most powerful kingdoms in southern India. Marthanda Varma led the Travancorean forces during the Travancore-Dutch War of 1739–46, which culminated in the Battle of Colachel. The defeat of the Dutch by Travancore is considered the earliest example of an organised power from Asia overcoming European military technology and tactics. Marthanda Varma went on to conquer most of the petty principalities of the native rulers. Travancore became the most dominant state in Kerala by defeating the powerful Zamorin of Kozhikode in the battle of Purakkad in 1755.

In the early 19th century, the kingdom became a princely state of the British Empire. The Travancore Government took many progressive steps on the socio-economic front and during the reign of Maharajah Sri Chithira Thirunal Balarama Varma, Travancore became a prosperous modern princely state in British India, with reputed achievements in education, political administration, public work, and social reforms. In 1903–1904, the total revenue of the state was Rs. 1,02,01,900.

Etymology

The kingdom takes its name from Thiruvithamcode in the present-day Kanyakumari district of Tamil Nadu.

The region had many small independent kingdoms. Later, at the peak of the Chera-Chola-Pandya, this region became part of the Chera Kingdom (except for the Ay kingdom, which always remained independent). When the region was part of the Chera empire, it was still known as Thiruvazhumkode. It was contracted to Thiruvankode, and anglicised by the English to Travancore.

In the course of time, the Ay kingdom, part of the Chera empire, which ruled the Thiruvazhumkode area, became independent, and the land was called Aayi Desam or Aayi Rajyam, meaning 'Aayi territory'. The Aayis controlled the land from the present-day Kollam district in the north, through the Thiruvananthapuram district, all of Kerala, to the Kanyakumari district. There were two capitals, the major one at Kollam (Venad Swaroopam or Desinganadu) and a subsidiary one at Thrippapur (Thrippapur Swaroopam or Nanjinad). The kingdom was thus also called Venad. Kings of Venad had, built residential palaces in Thiruvithamcode and Kalkulam. Thiruvithamcode became the capital of the Thrippapur Swaroopam, and the country was referred to as Thiruvithamcode by Europeans even after the capital had been moved in 1601 to Padmanabhapuram, near Kalkulam.

The Chera empire had dissolved by around 1100 and thereafter the territory comprised numerous small kingdoms until the time of Marthanda Varma who, as king of Venad from 1729, employed brutal methods to unify them. During his reign, Thiruvithamcode or Travancore became the official name.

Geography

The Kingdom of Travancore was located at the extreme southern tip of the Indian subcontinent. Geographically, Travancore was divided into three climatically distinct regions: the eastern highlands (rugged and cool mountainous terrain), the central midlands (rolling hills), and the western lowlands (coastal plains).

History

Ay dynasty

The ancient political and cultural history of central and southern Travancore was almost entirely independent from that of the rest of Kerala. The Chera dynasty governed the Malabar Coast between Alappuzha in the south and Kasaragod in the north. This included Palakkad Gap, Coimbatore, Salem, and the Kolli Hills. The region around Coimbatore was ruled by the Cheras during the Sangam period roughly between the first and the fourth centuries CE and served as the eastern entrance to the Palakkad Gap, the principal trade route between the Malabar Coast and Tamil Nadu. However the southern region of the present-day Kerala state (The coastal belt between Thiruvananthapuram and Alappuzha) was under the Ay dynasty, which was more related to the Pandya dynasty of Madurai than the Cheras.

Present-day Thiruvananthapuram city and district, and Kanyakumari district, were ruled by the Ay dynasty in ancient and medieval times, Tamil-speaking rulers based in the southernmost part of the Indian subcontinent. Ay kingdom experienced attacks and conquests by Cholas and Pandya dynasty at times. Later, it became part of Venad in the late Middle Ages, which eventually expanded into the princely state of Travancore in 18th century CE. The Tamil-Dravidian architecture of Padmanabhaswamy temple make it distinct and different from the architectural style of the temples in northern and central Kerala.

Modern-day southern Kerala (Thiruvananthapuram, Kollam, Pathanamthitta, etc.) were long ruled by Tamil dynasties such as the Ay kingdom and the Pandya dynasty, and Chola dynasty, until the 16th-17th century CE. The official language of Venad, based at Kollam, was also Tamil. The place names, the dialects of Malayalam spoken, and the customs of southern Kerala still reveal a close relationship with a Tamil heritage. Malayalam became more prevalent when Venad became Travancore by annexing the territories up to the present-day Ernakulam district.

Venad Swaroopam

The former state of Venad at the tip of the Indian subcontinent, traditionally ruled by rajas known as the Venattadis. Until the end of the 11th century AD, it was a small principality in the Ay Kingdom. The Ays were the earliest ruling dynasty in southern Kerala, who, at their zenith, ruled over a region from Nagercoil in the south to Trivandrum in the north. Their capital during the first Sangam age was in Aykudi and later, towards the end of the eighth century AD, at Quilon (Kollam). Though a series of attacks by the resurgent Pandyas between the seventh and eighth centuries caused the decline of the Ays, the dynasty was powerful until the beginning of the tenth century. Sulaiman al-Tajir, a Persian merchant who visited Kerala during the reign of Sthanu Ravi Varma (9th century CE), records that there was extensive trade between Kerala and China at that time, based at the port of Kollam.

When the Ay diminished, Venad became the southernmost principality of the Second Chera Kingdom. An invasion of the Cholas into Venad caused the destruction of Kollam in 1096. However, the Chera capital, Mahodayapuram, also fell in the subsequent Chola attack, which compelled the Chera king, Rama Varma Kulasekara, to shift his capital to Kollam. Thus, Rama Varma Kulasekara, the last emperor of the Chera dynasty, was probably the founder of the Venad royal house, and the title of the Chera kings, Kulasekara, was thenceforth kept by the rulers of Venad. Thus the end of the Second Chera dynasty in the 12th century marks the independence of Venad.

In the second half of the 12th century, two branches of the Ay dynasty, the Thrippappur and Chirava, merged in the Venad family, which set up the tradition of designating the ruler of Venad as Chirava Moopan and the heir-apparent as Thrippappur Moopan. While the Chrirava Moopan had his residence at Kollam, the Thrippappur Moopan resided at his palace in Thrippappur, nine miles north of Thiruvananthapuram, and was vested with authority over the temples of Venad kingdom, especially the Sri Padmanabhaswamy temple.

Formation and development of Travancore

In the early 18th century CE, the Travancore royal family adopted some members from the royal family of Kolathunadu based at Kannur, and Parappanad in present-day Malappuram district. The history of Travancore began with Marthanda Varma, who inherited the kingdom of Venad (Thrippappur), and expanded it into Travancore during his reign (1729–1758). After defeating a union of feudal lords and establishing internal peace, he expanded the kingdom of Venad through a series of military campaigns from Kanyakumari in the south to the borders of Kochi in the north during his 29-year rule. This rule also included Travancore-Dutch War (1739–1753) between Travancore and the Dutch East India Company, which had been allied to some of these kingdoms.

In 1741, Travancore won the Battle of Colachel against the Dutch East India Company, resulting in the complete eclipse of Dutch power in the region. In this battle, the Dutch Captain, Eustachius De Lannoy, was captured. He later defected to Travancore.

De Lannoy was appointed captain of His Highness' bodyguard and later Senior Admiral ("Valiya kappittan") and modernised the Travancore army by introducing firearms and artillery. From 1741 to 1758, De Lannoy remained in command of the Travancore forces and was involved in annexation of small principalities.

Travancore became the most dominant state in the Kerala region by defeating the powerful Zamorin of Kozhikode in the battle of Purakkad in 1755. Ramayyan Dalawa, the prime minister (1737–1756) of Marthanda Varma, also played an important role in this consolidation and expansion.

On 3 January 1750, (5 Makaram, 925 Kollavarsham), Marthanda Varma virtually "dedicated" Travancore to his tutelary deity Padmanabha, one of the aspects of the Hindu God Vishnu with a lotus issuing from his navel on which Brahma sits. From then on the rulers of Travancore ruled as the "servants of Padmanabha" (the Padmnabha-dasar).

At the Battle of Ambalapuzha, Marthanda Varma defeated the union of the kings who had been deposed and the king of the Cochin kingdom.

Mysore invasion

Marthanda Varma's successor Karthika Thirunal Rama Varma (1758–1798), who was popularly known as Dharma Raja, shifted the capital in 1795 from Padmanabhapuram to Thiruvananthapuram. Dharma Raja's period is considered a Golden Age in the history of Travancore. He not only retained the territorial gains of his predecessor, but also improved and encouraged social development. He was greatly assisted by a very efficient administrator, Raja Kesavadas, the Diwan of Travancore. 

Travancore often allied with the English East India Company in military conflicts. During Dharma Raja's reign, Tipu Sultan, the de facto ruler of Mysore and the son of Hyder Ali, attacked Travancore in 1789 as a part of the Mysore invasion of Kerala. Dharma Raja had earlier refused to hand over the Hindu political refugees from the Mysore occupation of Malabar who had been given asylum in Travancore. The Mysore army entered the Cochin kingdom from Coimbatore in November 1789 and reached Trichur in December. On 28 December 1789 Tipu Sultan attacked the Nedunkotta (Northern Lines) from the north, causing the Battle of Nedumkotta (1789), and the defeat of Mysore army.

Velu Thampi Dalawa's rebellion

On Dharma Raja's death in 1798, Balarama Varma (1798–1810), the weakest ruler of the dynasty, took over at the age of sixteen. A treaty brought Travancore under a Subsidiary alliance with the East India Company in 1795.

The Prime Ministers (Dalawas or Dewans) started to take control of the kingdom beginning with Velu Thampi Dalawa (Velayudhan Chempakaraman Thampi) (1799–1809) who was appointed as the divan following the dismissal of Jayanthan Sankaran Nampoothiri (1798–1799). Initially, Velayudhan Chempakaraman Thampi and the English East India Company got along very well. When a section of the Travancore army mutinied in 1805 against Velu Thampi Dalawa, he sought refuge with the British Resident Colonel (later General) Colin Macaulay and later used English East India Company troops to crush the mutiny. Velu Thampi also played a key role in negotiating a new treaty between Travancore and the English East India Company. However, the demands of the East India Company for the payment of compensation for their involvement in the Travancore-Mysore War (1791) on behalf of Travancore, led to tension between the Diwan and Colonel Macaulay. Velu Thampi and the diwan of Cochin kingdom, Paliath Achan Govindan Menon, who was unhappy with Macaulay for granting asylum to his enemy Kunhi Krishna Menon, declared "war" on the East India Company. 

The East India Company army defeated Paliath Achan's army in Cochin on 27 February 1809. Paliath Achan surrendered to the East India Company and was exiled to Madras and later to Benaras. The Company defeated forces under Velu Thampi Dalawa at battles near Nagercoil and Kollam, and inflicted heavy casualties on the rebels, many of whom then deserted and went back home. The Maharajah of Travancore, who hitherto had not openly taken any part in the rebellion, now allied with the British and appointed one of Thampi's enemies as his prime minister. The allied East India Company army and the Travancore soldiers camped in Pappanamcode, just outside Trivandrum. Velu Thampi Dalawa now organised a guerrilla struggle against the company, but committed suicide to avoid capture by the Travancore army. After the mutiny of 1805 against Velu Thampi Dalawa, most of the Nair army battalions of Travancore were disbanded, and after Velu Thampi Dalawa's uprising, almost all of the remaining Travancore forces were also disbanded, with the East India Company undertaking to serve the Rajah in cases of external and internal aggression.

Cessation of mahādanams

The Rajahs of Travancore had been conditionally promoted to Kshatriyahood with periodic performance of 16 mahādānams (great gifts in charity) such as Hiranya-garbhā, Hiranya-Kāmadhenu, and Hiranyāswaratā in which each of which thousands of Brahmins had been given costly gifts apart from each getting a minimum of 1 kazhanch (78.65 gm) of gold. In 1848 the Marquess of Dalhousie, then Governor-General of India, was apprised that the depressed condition of the finances in Travancore was due to the mahādanams by the rulers. Lord Dalhousie instructed Lord Harris, Governor of the Madras Presidency, to warn the then King of Travancore, Martanda Varma (Uttram Tirunal 1847–60), that if he did not put a stop to this practice, the Madras Presidency would take over his state's administration. This led to the cessation of the practice of mahādanams. 

All Travancore kings including Sree Moolam Thirunal conducted the Hiranyagarbham and Tulapurushadaanam ceremonies. Maharaja Chithira Thirunal was the only King of Travancore not to have conducted these rituals as he considered them extremely costly.

The 19th and early 20th centuries

In Travancore, the caste system was more rigorously enforced than in many other parts of India up to the mid-1800s. The hierarchical caste order was deeply entrenched in the social system and was supported by the government, which transformed this caste-based social system into a religious institution. In such a context, the belief in Ayyavazhi, apart from being a religious system, served also as a reform movement in uplifting the downtrodden of society, both socially and religiously. The rituals of Ayyavazhi constituted a social discourse. Its beliefs, mode of worship, and religious organisation seem to have enabled the Ayyavazhi group to negotiate, cope with, and resist the imposition of authority. The hard tone of Vaikundar towards this was perceived as a revolution against the government. So King Swathi Thirunal Rama Varma initially imprisoned Vaikundar in the Singarathoppu jail, where the jailor Appaguru ended up as a disciple of Vaikundar. Vaikundar was later set at liberty by the King.

After the death of Sree Moolam Thirunal in 1924, Sethu Lakshmi Bayi became regent (1924–1931), as the heir apparent, Sree Chithira Thirunal was then a minor, 12 years old.

In 1935, Travancore joined the Indian State Forces Scheme and a Travancore unit was named 1st Travancore Nair Infantry, Travancore State Forces. The unit was reorganised as an Indian State Infantry Battalion by Lieutenant Colonel H S Steward, who was appointed commandant of the Travancore State Forces.

The last ruling king of Travancore, Chithira Thirunal Balarama Varma, reigned from 1931 to 1949. "His reign marked revolutionary progress in the fields of education, defence, economy and society as a whole." He made the famous Temple Entry Proclamation on 12 November 1936, which opened all the Kshetrams (Hindu temples in Kerala) in Travancore to all Hindus, a privilege until then reserved to upper-caste Hindus. This act won him praise from across India, most notably from Mahatma Gandhi. The first public transport system (Thiruvananthapuram–Mavelikkara) and telecommunication system (Thiruvananthapuram Palace–Mavelikkara Palace) were launched during his reign. He also started the industrialisation of the state, enhancing the role of the public sector. He introduced heavy industry in the state and established giant public sector undertakings. As many as twenty industries were established, mostly for utilizing the local raw materials such as rubber, ceramics, and minerals. A majority of the premier industries in Kerala even today, were established by Sree Chithira Thirunal. He patronized musicians, artists, dancers, and Vedic scholars. Sree Chithira Thirunal appointed, for the first time, an Art Advisor to the Government, Dr. G. H. Cousins. He also established a new form of University Training Corps, viz. Labour Corps, preceding the N.C.C, in the educational institutions. The expenses of the university were to be met fully by the government. Sree Chithira Thirunal also built a beautiful palace named Kowdiar Palace, finished in 1934, which was previously an old Naluektu, given by Sree Moolam Thirunal to his mother Sethu Parvathi Bayi in 1915.

However, his prime minister, Sir C. P. Ramaswami Iyer, was unpopular among the communists of Travancore. The tension between the Communists and Iyer led to minor riots. In one such riot in Punnapra-Vayalar in 1946, the Communist rioters established their own government in the area. This was put down by the Travancore Army and Navy. The prime minister issued a statement in June 1947 that Travancore would remain an independent country instead of joining the Indian Union; subsequently, an attempt was made on his life, following which he resigned and left for Madras, to be succeeded by Sri P.G.N. Unnithan. According to witnesses such as K.Aiyappan Pillai, constitutional adviser to the Maharaja and historians like A. Sreedhara Menon, the rioters and mob-attacks had no bearing on the decision of the Maharaja. After several rounds of discussion and negotiation between Sree Chithira Thirunal and V.P. Menon, the king agreed that the Kingdom should accede to the Indian Union on 12 August 1947. On 1 July 1949 the Kingdom of Travancore was merged with the Kingdom of Cochin and the short-lived state of Travancore-Kochi was formed.

On 11 July 1991, Maharaja Sree Chithira Thirunal suffered a stroke and was admitted to a hospital, where he died on 20 July. He had ruled Travancore for 67 years and at his death was one of the few surviving rulers of a first-class princely state in the old British Raj. He was also the last surviving Knight Grand Commander of both the Order of the Star of India and of the Order of the Indian Empire. He was succeeded as head of the Royal House as well as the Titular Maharajah of Travancore by his younger brother, Uthradom Thirunal Marthanda Varma. The Government of India issued a stamp on 6 Nov 1991, commemorating the reforms that marked his reign in Travancore.

Formation of Kerala

The State of Kerala came into existence on 1 November 1956, with a governor appointed by the president of India as the head of state instead of a king. The king was stripped of all his political powers and the right to receive privy purses, according to the twenty-sixth amendment of the Indian constitution act of 31 July 1971. He died on 20 July 1991.

Merger of Kanyakumari with Madras State

Tamils lived in large numbers in the Thovalai, Agastheeswaram, Sengottai, Eraniel, Vilavancode, Kalkulam, Devikulam, Neyyattinkara, Thiruvananthapuram South and Thiruvananthapuram North taluks of erstwhile Travancore State. In the Tamil regions, Malayalam was the official language and there were only a few Tamil schools. So the Tamils met many hardships. The Travancore state government continued rejecting the requests of Tamils. During that period the Travancore State Congress favoured the idea of uniting all the Malayalam speaking regions and forming a "Unified Kerala". In protest against this idea, many Tamil leaders vacated the party. Tamils gathered together at Nagercoil on 16 December 1945 under the leadership of Sam Nathaniel and formed the new political party All Travancore Tamilian Congress. That party pushed for the merger of Tamil regions in Travancore with Tamil Nadu. During the election campaign, clashes occurred between the Tamil Nadar community and the Malayali Nair community in Kalkulam – Vilavancode taluks. The police force suppressed the agitating Nadars. In February 1948 police opened fire and two Tamil-speaking Nadars were killed.

In the working committee meeting of Tamilian congress at Eraviputhur on 30 June 1946, the name of the political party was changed to Travancore Tamil Nadu Congress (T.T.N.C). T.T.N.C was popular among the Tamils living in Thovalai and Agateeswaram taluks. Ma. Po. Sivagnanam (Ma.Po.Si) was the only leader from Tamil Nadu who acted in favour of T.T.N.C. After the independence of India, State Assembly elections were announced in Travancore. As a consequence, T.T.N.C improved its popularity among Tamils. A popular and leading advocate from Vilavancode, A. Nesamony organised a meeting of his supporters at Allan Memorial Hall, Nagercoil on 8 September 1947. In that meeting it was declared that they must achieve their objective through their political organisation, the T.T.N.C. And T.T.N.C started gaining strength and momentum in Kalkulam – Vilavancode Taluks.

T.T.N.C won in 14 constituencies in the election to the State Legislative Assembly. Mr. A. Nesamony was elected as the legislative leader of the party. Then under his leadership, the awakened Tamil population was prepared to undergo any sacrifice to achieve their goal.

In 1950, a meeting was held at Palayamkottai to make compromises between state congress and T.T.N.C. The meeting met with failure and Mr. Sam Nathaniel resigned from the post of president of T.T.N.C Mr. P. Ramasamy Pillai, a strong follower of Mr. A. Nesamony was elected as the New President. The first general election of Independent India was held on 1952. T.T.N.C won 8 legislative assembly seats. Mr. A. Chidambaranathan became the minister on behalf of T.T.N.C in the coalition state government formed by the Congress. In the parliamentary Constituency Mr. A. Nesamony was elected as M.P. and in the Rajyasabha seat. Mr. A. Abdul Razak was elected as M.P. on behalf of T.T.N.C. In due course, accusing the Congress government for not showing enough care the struggle of the Tamils, T.T.N.C had broken away from the coalition and the Congress government lost the majority. So fresh elections were announced. In 1954 elections, T.T.N.C gained victory in 12 constituencies. 
Pattom Thanu Pillai was the chief minister for Thiru – Kochi legislative assembly. He engaged hard measures against the agitations of Tamils. Especially the Tamils at Devikulam – Peermedu regions went through the atrocities of Travancore Police force. Condemning the attitude of the police, T.T.N.C leaders from Nagercoil went to Munnar and participated in agitations against the prohibitive orders. The leaders were arrested and an uncalm atmosphere prevailed in South Travancore.

On 11 August, Liberation Day celebrations were held at many places in South Travancore. Public meetings and processions were organised. Communists also collaborated with the agitation programmes. Police opened fire at the processions in Thoduvetty (Martandam) and Puthukadai. Nine Tamil volunteers were killed and thousands of T.T.N.C and communist sympathizers were arrested in various parts of Tamil main land. At the end, Pattom Thanu Pillai's ministry was toppled and normalcy returned to the Tamil regions. The central government had appointed Fazal Ali Commission(1953 dec) for the states reorganisation based on language. It submitted its report on 10 August 1955. Based on this report, Devikulam – Peermedu and Neyyattinkara Taluks were merged with Kerala state. On 1 November 1956 – four Taluks Thovalai, Agastheeswaram, Kalkulam, Vilavancode were recognised to form the New Kanyakumari District and merged with Tamil Nadu State. Half of Sengottai Taluk was merged with Tirunelveli District. The main demand of T.T.N.C was to merger the Tamil regions with Tamil Nadu and major part of its demand was realised. So T.T.N.C was dissolved thereafter.

Retainment of Devikulam and Peerumedu Taluks in Kerala

Apart from Kanyakumari district, the Taluks of Devikulam and Peermade in present-day Idukki district also had a Tamil-majority until late 1940's. The T.T.N.C had also requested to merge these Taluks with Madras State. However it was due to some decisions of Pattom Thanu Pillai, who was the first prime minister of Travancore, that they retained in the modern-state of Kerala. Pattom came up with a colonisation project to re-engineer the demography of Cardamom Hills. His colonisation project was to relocate 8,000 Malayalam-speaking families into the Taluks of Devikulam and Peermade. About 50,000 acres in these Taluks, which were Tamil-majority area, were chosen for the colonisation project. As a victory of the Colonisation project done by post-independence Travancore, these two Taluks and a larger portion of Cardamom Hills retained in the state of Kerala, after States Reorganisation Act, 1956.

Politics

Under the direct control of the King, Travancore's administration was headed by a Dewan assisted by the Neetezhutthu Pillay or secretary, Rayasom Pillay (assistant or under-secretary) and a number of Rayasoms or clerks along with Kanakku Pillamars (accountants). Individual districts were run by Sarvadhikaris under the supervision of Diwan, while dealings with the neighbouring states and Europeans was under the purview of the Valia Sarvahi, who signed treaties and agreements.

Rulers of Travancore

 Anizham Tirunal Marthanda Varma 1729–1758
 Karthika Thirunal Rama Varma (Dharma Raja) 1758–1798
 Balarama Varma I 1798–1810
 Gowri Lakshmi Bayi 1810–1815 (Queen from 1810 to 1813 and Regent Queen from 1813 to 1815)
 Gowri Parvati Bayi (Regent) 1815–1829
 Swathi Thirunal Rama Varma II 1813–1846
 Uthram Thirunal Marthanda Varma II 1846–1860
 Ayilyam Thirunal Rama Varma III 1860–1880
 Visakham Thirunal Rama Varma IV 1880–1885
 Sree Moolam Thirunal Rama Varma VI 1885–1924
 Sethu Lakshmi Bayi (Regent) 1924–1931
 Chithira Thirunal Balarama Varma II 1924–1949 / died 1991

Prime Ministers of Travancore

Dalawas

 Arumukham Pillai 1729–1736
 Thanu Pillai 1736–1737
 Ramayyan Dalawa 1737–1756
 Martanda Pillai 1756–1763
 Warkala Subbayyan 1763–1768
 Krishna Gopalayyan 1768–1776
 Vadiswaran Subbrahmanya Iyer 1776–1780
 Mullen Chempakaraman Pillai 1780–1782
 Nagercoil Ramayyan 1782–1788
 Krishnan Chempakaraman 1788–1789
 Raja Kesavadas 1789–1798
 Odiery Jayanthan Sankaran Nampoothiri 1798–1799
 Velu Thampi Dalawa 1799–1809
 Oommini Thampi 1809–1811

Dewans

 Col. John Munro 1811–1814
 Devan Padmanabhan Menon 1814–1814
 Bappu Rao (acting) 1814–1815
 Sanku Annavi Pillai 1815–1815
 Raman Menon 1815–1817
 Reddy Row 1817–1821
 T. Venkata Rao 1821–1830
 Thanjavur Subha Rao 1830–1837
 T. Ranga Rao (acting) 1837–1838
 T. Venkata Rao (Again) 1838–1839
 Thanjavur Subha Rao (again) 1839–1842
 Krishna Rao (acting) 1842–1843
 Reddy Row (again) 1843–1845
 Srinivasa Rao (acting) 1845–1846
 Krishna Rao 1846–1858

Prime Ministers of Travancore (1948-49)

Administrative divisions

In 1856, the princely state was sub-divided into three divisions, each of which was administered by a Divan Peishkar, with a rank equivalent to a District Collector in British India. These were the:
 Northern (Cottayam) comprising the talukas of Sharetalay, Vycome, Yetmanoor, Cottayam, Chunginacherry, Meenachil, Thodupolay, Moovatupolay, Kunnathnaud, Alangaud and Paravoor;
 Quilon (Central), comprising the talukas of Amabalapulay, Chengannoor, Pandalam, Kunnattur, Karungapully, Kartikapully, Harippad, Mavelikaray, Quilon; and
 Southern (Padmanabhapuram) comprising the talukas of Thovalay, Auguteeswarom, Kalculam, Eraneel, and Velavencode.

Divisions according to the 1911 Census of Travancore

1. Padmanabhapuram Division

The 1911 Census Report of Travancore states that Padmanabhapuram Division was the original seat of Travancore, where Thiruvithamcode and Padmanabhapuram are located. The report further states that a vast majority of this division was ethnic Tamils. Padamanabhapuram Division consisted of the present-day district of Kanyakumari in Tamil Nadu. The report also states that the two southernmost Taluks of this division, namely Thovalai and Agastheeswaram, geographically too more resembles to Pandya Nadu of Tamil country and the eastern Coromandel Coast of the Madras Presidency than the rest of Malayalam country.

2. Trivandrum Division

It was the headquarters of Travancore since 1795. The Neyyattinkara taluk was a main seat of industry according the 1911 census report of Travancore. This division also contained many ethnic Tamils, mostly concentrated in the southern Taluks of Neyyattinkara and Thiruvananthapuram. The Trivandrum Division consisted of the present-day Thiruvananthapuram district excluding the British colony at Anchuthengu.

3. Quilon Division

Quilon was the capital of Venad and the largest port town in Travancore, and was also one of the oldest ports on Malabar Coast. The 1911 Census of Travancore states that it was from Quilon division onwards that the genuine country of Malayalam starts. However, the Sengottai taluk of this division which was earlier under Kottarakkara Thampuran, was a Tamil-majority region. Geographically too Sengottai resembled to Madurai and Pandya Nadu than rest of the Malayalam country.

4. Kottayam Division

It was situated in the northernmost area of Travancore. It was a pure Malayalam-speaking and geographical region. The Vembanad Lake was a speciality of this division.

5. Devikulam Division

It consisted most of the present-day Idukki district. It was also related to Pandya Nadu and Kongu Nadu. Devikulam division was Tamil-speaking region.

Demographics

Travancore had a population of 6,070,018 at the time of the 1941 Census of India.

Religions

Languages

Currency

Unlike the rest of India, Travancore divided the rupee into unique values, as represented on coins and stamps, as follows:

Cash and Chuckram coins are copper. Travancore Fanam and Travancore Rupee coins are silver.

Culture

Travancore was characterised by the popularity of its rulers among their subjects. The kings of Travancore, unlike their counterparts in the other princely states of India, spent only a small portion of their state's resources for personal use. This was in sharp contrast with some of the northern Indian kings. Since they spent most of the state's revenue for the benefit of the public, they were naturally much loved by their subjects.

Violence rooted in religion or caste was uncommon in Travancore, but the barriers based on these parameters were rigid. Swami Vivekananda described Travancore as The Lunatic Asylum in India due to the level of caste discrimination. Vaikom Satyagraha point out the high-level Casteism existed in Travancore. Tamil Brahmins and Nairs alone dominated the bureaucracy until 20th century. Many political ideologies (such as communism) and social reforms were not welcomed in Travancore, and in Punnapra, communist protesters were fired at. Travancore royal family were devout Hindus. Some kings practiced untouchability with British officers, European aristocrats and diplomats (for instance, Richard Temple-Nugent-Brydges-Chandos-Grenville, 3rd Duke of Buckingham and Chandos, has reported that Maharaja Visakham Thirunal had to take bath after touching Richard's Mrs., to remove ritual pollution, when they visited in 1880). The decline of caste system began at the end of the 19th Century due to a series of reformation movements. As a result, the Kingdom of Travancore became the region with the highest male literacy rate in India.

Unlike most of India, just like in Dakshina Kannada, in Travancore (and the rest of Kerala), the social status and freedom of women in higher castes were relatively high. However, the Upper cloth revolt of 19th century is an exception to this. The women of lower caste hadn't the permission to wear upper cloth in Travancore. In some communities, the daughters inherited the property (though property was exclusively administered by men, their brothers) (until 1925), were educated, and had the right to divorce and remarry, but due to laws passed starting from 1925, by regent queen Sethu Lakshmi Bayi proper patriarchy was established and now women have relatively little rights.

Notable people

 

Mor Severios ( 1851–1927), Metropolitan

See also

 Zamorin of Calicut
 Kingdom of Cochin
 Marthanda Varma
 Travancore-Cochin
 Thachudaya Kaimal
 Battle of Colachel
 Travancore War
 Travancore rupee
 Battle of Nedumkotta
 Cochin - Travancore Alliance (1761)
 Cochin Travancore War (1755–1756)
 Kingdom of Mysore
 Upper cloth revolt
 Vaikom Satyagraha
 Temple Entry Proclamation
 Merger of Kanyakumari with Madras State
 Madras Presidency
 Malabar District
 Marthandavarma (novel)
 The Years of Rice and Salt, an acclaimed novel that features an alternate history Travancore

Notes

References

Citations

Bibliography 

  (Digital book format)

Further reading
 
  (a second revision was published in 1939)

Census reports

External links

 Travancore State Manual by T.K.Velu Pillai

 
History of Kollam
1729 establishments in India
1949 disestablishments in India
Feudal states of Kerala
Historical Indian regions
Kingdoms of Kerala
Princely states of India
Former British colonies and protectorates in Asia
Travancore–Cochin
Historical Hindu empires